Maximilian Göppel (born 31 August 1997) is a Liechtensteiner footballer who plays as a defender for Swiss 1. Liga club USV Eschen/Mauren and the Liechtenstein national team.

Club career

Vaduz
On 21 September 2016, he made his debut for Vaduz in Swiss Super League against Young Boys.

USV Eschen/Mauren 
On 25 February 2021, Goeppel moved to USV Eschen/Mauren

International career
Göppel is a member of the Liechtenstein national football team, making his debut in a friendly match against Iceland on 6 June 2016. Göppel also made nine appearances for the Liechtenstein U21 between 2014 and 2017.

On 9 October 2016, he scored his first goal in a 1–2 away defeat to Israel.

Career statistics

International

International goals
As of match played 14 November 2021. Liechtenstein score listed first, score column indicates score after each Göppel goal.

Personal life
He is the older brother of Liechtenstein women's international player Lena Göppel.

Honours

FC Vaduz
Liechtenstein Football Cup (3): 2016-17, 2017-18, 2018-19

Individual
 Special prize LFV Award (1): 2017

References

1997 births
Living people
Liechtenstein footballers
Association football defenders
FC Balzers players
FC Vaduz players
Liechtenstein international footballers
People from Vaduz